J. McCullough was a Scottish author and avid golfer of the late 19th century. His fame rests on two books, Golf in the Year 2000, or, What we are coming to (1892) and Golf: Containing Practical Hints, with Rules of the Game (1899).

McCullough wrote his latter book under "J. McCullough" and his earlier one under the pseudonym "J.A.C.K." Sources conflict as to whether his first name was Jack or Jay, and most other biographical information on him is completely lacking.

Golf: Containing Practical Hints, with Rules of the Game opens a window on a simpler era in the game, and for that reason may be considered outdated by modern players and fans. Nonetheless, its understanding of human foibles as they manifest themselves on the golf course gives it a timeless quality, and McCullough's good humor and wit make it a pleasure to read even for non-golfers. The full text of this book is also available online.

References

19th-century Scottish writers
Year of birth missing
Year of death missing
19th-century British male writers
Scottish male writers